The 1888 South Australian Football Association season was the 12th season of the top-level Australian rules football competition in South Australia. Hotham Club was renamed North Adelaide for the 1888 Season but disbanded at the end of the Season following a merger with Adelaide. It has no connection with the North Adelaide Football Club currently in the SANFL. Medinidie joined in 1888 later to be renamed North Adelaide for the 1893 Season.

Premiership season

Round 1

Round 2

Round 3

Round 4

Round 5

Round 6

Round 7

Round 9

Round 10

Round 11

Round 12

Round 13

Round 14

Round 15

Round 16

Ladder

References 

SANFL
South Australian National Football League seasons